The Chinali–Lahul languages, or Chinali–Lahuli, are a pair of closely related languages with uncertain relationship within the Indo-Aryan languages. They are,
Chinali
Lahul Lohar
The languages have a couple thousand or so speakers altogether.

References

Unclassified Indo-Aryan languages